Arthur Gordon may refer to:
 Arthur Hamilton-Gordon, 1st Baron Stanmore (1829–1912), British colonial administrator
 Arthur Gordon (politician) (1896–1953), Canadian manufacturer and politician
 Arthur Gordon (priest) (born 1910), Dean of Ross, Ireland, 1968–1978
 Arthur E. Gordon (1902–1989), American Classicist

See also
 Gordon Arthur (disambiguation)